Congregation Kolot Chayeinu ("Voices of Our Lives") is a Jewish congregation in Park Slope, Brooklyn, New York.

History 
Rabbi Ellen Lippmann established Kolot Chayeinu, a progressive Jewish synagogue in Brooklyn in 1993, initially as a small group of people that met around her dining room table.  Over the years it has grown to have its own space and staff, including an ordained cantor; 300+ members, and a Children's Learning Program.

References

External links
Congregation Kolot Chayeinu website

Synagogues in Brooklyn
Unaffiliated synagogues in New York City